Rehana Leghari is a Pakistani politician who is the current Deputy Speaker of the Provincial Assembly of Sindh, in office since August 2018. She has been a Member of the Provincial Assembly of Sindh, since August 2018. Previously, she was a member of the Provincial Assembly of Sindh from June 2013 to May 2018.

Early life
She was born in 1971 in Sujawal district.

Political career

She was elected to the Provincial Assembly of Sindh as a candidate of Pakistan Peoples Party (PPP) on a reserved seat for women in 2013 Pakistani general election.

In August 2016, she was inducted into the provincial Sindh cabinet of Chief Minister Syed Murad Ali Shah and was appointed as special assistants to Chief Minister on human rights.

She was re-elected to the Provincial Assembly of Sindh as a candidate of PPP on a reserved seat for women in 2018 Pakistani general election. Following her successful election, PPP nominated her for the office of deputy speaker of the Sindh Assembly. On 15 August 2018, she was elected as Deputy Speaker of the Provincial Assembly of Sindh. She received 98 votes against her opponent Rabia Azfar Nizami who secured 59 votes.

References

Living people
1971 births
Sindh MPAs 2013–2018
Pakistan People's Party MPAs (Sindh)
Women legislative deputy speakers
Deputy Speakers of the Provincial Assembly of Sindh
Women members of the Provincial Assembly of Sindh
People from Sujawal District
21st-century Pakistani women politicians